The 1909 Kansas State Aggies football team represented Kansas State Agricultural College (now Kansas State University) in the 1909 college football season. In their fifth year under head coach Mike Ahearn, the Aggies compiled a 7–2 record, and outscored their opponents by a combined total of 320 to 11.

Schedule

References

Kansas State
Kansas State Wildcats football seasons
Kansas State Aggies football